The canton of Dreux-1 is an administrative division of the Eure-et-Loir department, northern France. It was created at the French canton reorganisation which came into effect in March 2015. Its seat is in Dreux.

It consists of the following communes:
 
Allainville
Aunay-sous-Crécy
Boissy-en-Drouais
Crécy-Couvé
Dreux (partly)
Garancières-en-Drouais
Garnay
Louvilliers-en-Drouais
Marville-Moutiers-Brûlé
Saulnières
Tréon
Vernouillet
Vert-en-Drouais

References

Cantons of Eure-et-Loir